Kif Tebbi is a 1928 Italian silent war film directed by Mario Camerini. The film portrays the Italo-Turkish War. A young Italian-educated Libyan nobleman is summoned to fight for the Ottoman Empire when war breaks out in 1911, but eventually decides to change sides and support Italy.

Production

The film promoted the Italian Fascist regime's imperial policies in Libya and in wider Africa. While privately funded (although the government supported its production) the film foreshadowed future collaborations between the film industry and the Italian state.

Cast
 Donatella Neri as Mne  
 Carlo Benetti 
 Piero Carnabuci as Mabruk El Gadi 
 Nini Dinelli as Rasim Ben Abdalla  
 Ugo Gracci as Taleb 
 Paolo Orsini
 Alberto Pasquali as Uff. Degli Zaptie  
 Enrico Scatizzi as Comandante Turchi  
 Marcello Spada as Ismail 
 Raimondo Van Riel 
 Gino Viotti as Ajad Padre Di Ismail  
 Renato Visca as Fratello Ismail

References

Bibliography 
 Ben-Ghiat, Ruth. Fascist Modernities: Italy, 1922-1945. University of California Press, 2004. 
 Del Boca, Angelo. Mohamed Fekini and the Fight to Free Libya. Palgrave Macmillan, 2011.

External links

 

1920s war drama films
Italian war drama films
Italian silent feature films
1920s Italian-language films
Films directed by Mario Camerini
Films set in the 1910s
Films set in Libya
Italian black-and-white films
1928 drama films
1928 films
Silent war drama films
1920s Italian films